The 1975–76 SM-liiga season was the inaugural season for the new top level series of ice hockey in Finland, SM-liiga. The season featured 10 teams who played 36 game regular season followed by playoffs for top 4 teams. Points were given as follows: 2 from win, 1 point from tie and 0 points from loss

Regular season

Regular season standings
Note: GP = Games played, W = Wins, T = Ties, L = Losses, Pts = Points, GF = Goals for, GA = Goals against

Teams written in bold letters advance to playoffs.

Regular season scoring leaders
Note: GP = Games played, G = Goals, A = Assists, Pts = Points, PIM = Penalties in minutes

Playoffs

Semi finals

TPS Win Best of 3 Series 2-0.

Tappara win best of 3 Series 2-0.

Bronze medal games

Ässät win best of 3 Series 2-0 and the Bronze Medals for the 1975–76 SM-liiga season.

Finals
The finals took place on 18–19 March.

TPS win the Best of 3 Series 2-0 and the 1975–76 SM-liiga championship.

Playoffs scoring leaders
Note: GP = Games played, G = Goals, A = Assists, Pts = Points, PIM = Penalties in minutes

Relegation
Note: GP = Games played, W = Wins, T = Ties, L = Losses, Pts = Points, GF = Goals for, GA = Goals against

Replay
Kärpät - Kiekkoreipas 3-4 OT

References
 Hockey Archives

1975–76 in Finnish ice hockey
Fin
Liiga seasons